Mashari (also Romanized as Māshārī) is a village in Siyahu Rural District, Fin District, Bandar Abbas County, Hormozgan Province, Iran. At the 2006 census, its population was 75, in 25 families.

References 

Populated places in Bandar Abbas County